Silver Linings Playbook is a 2012 American romantic comedy-drama film directed by David O. Russell. An adaptation of the novel of same name by Matthew Quick, the film stars Bradley Cooper and Jennifer Lawrence, with Robert De Niro, Jacki Weaver, Chris Tucker, Anupam Kher, and Julia Stiles in supporting roles. The film tells the story of, Patrizio "Pat" Solitano, Jr. (Cooper), a man with bipolar disorder who finds companionship in a young widow, Tiffany Maxwell (Lawrence).

Silver Linings Playbook premiered at the 2012 Toronto International Film Festival on September 8, 2012, where Russell won the People's Choice Award. The film initially received a limited release in the United States on November 16, 2012. The Weinstein Company later gave the film a wider release at over 700 theaters on December 25. Silver Linings Playbook earned a worldwide total of over $236 million on a production budget of $21 million. Rotten Tomatoes, a review aggregator, surveyed 228 reviews and judged 92 percent to be positive.

Silver Linings Playbook received awards and nominations in a variety of categories with particular praise for its direction, screenplay, and the performances of Cooper, Lawrence, and De Niro. As of 2013, it has received a total of 47 awards from 91 nominations. At the 85th Academy Awards, the film received eight nominations, and won Best Actress (Lawrence). At the same ceremony, it became the first film in 31 years to be nominated in all four acting categories. At the 66th British Academy Film Awards, Russell won the Best Adapted Screenplay award. The film was nominated for four awards at the 70th Golden Globe Awards, going on to win one—Best Actress in a Comedy or Musical. Among other honors, Silver Linings Playbook was named Best Film at the AACTA Awards, Detroit Film Critics Society, Film Independent Spirit Awards, and Satellite Awards. It also received a Grammy Award for Best Song Written for Visual Media nomination for the song "Silver Lining (Crazy 'Bout You)".

Accolades

See also
 2012 in film

Notes

References

External links
 

Lists of accolades by film